Lisa Rideout is a Canadian documentary filmmaker. She is best known for her work on the documentaries Take a Walk on the Wildside and One Leg In, One Leg Out.

Career
Rideout holds a MFA degree in documentary media from Ryerson University and her MA in critical media and cultural studies from the School of Oriental and African Studies. She founded her production company, Lifted Eyes Media, in 2013. In 2017, her documentary, Take a Walk on the Wildside, about a clothing store which caters to the unique needs of crossdressers, premiered at the Hot Docs Canadian International Documentary Festival. It went on to win the Canadian Screen Award for Best Short Documentary at the 6th Canadian Screen Awards in 2018.

In 2018, her documentary, His Nose, Her Eyes, Whose Face? premiered, it was inspired by her own multiracial experience. Her documentary, One Leg In, One Leg Out premiered in 2018, about a sex worker who balances her clients with her social work aspirations. She was one of the directors for the series This Is Pop, which aired on CTV in Canada and Netflix internationally in 2021. She is also slated to direct the upcoming documentary feature Let’s Talk About Sex, about sex educator Sue Johanson.

Filmography

Awards and nominations

References

External links
 
 

Living people
Year of birth missing (living people)
Canadian documentary film directors
Canadian documentary film producers
21st-century Canadian women writers
Directors of Genie and Canadian Screen Award winners for Best Short Documentary Film
Canadian women film directors
Canadian women film producers
Canadian women documentary filmmakers